= CODEN =

Bibliographic code for identifying publications

CODEN – according to ASTM standard E250 – is a six-character, alphanumeric bibliographic code that provides concise, unique and unambiguous identification of the titles of periodicals and non-serial publications from all subject areas.

CODEN became particularly common in the scientific community as a citation system for periodicals cited in technical and chemistry-related publications and as a search tool in many bibliographic catalogues.

== History ==
CODEN was designed by Charles Bishop (1920–2014) sometime in the late 1940s or early 1950s. Bishop worked at what was then the Chronic Disease Research Institute at the University at Buffalo, State University of New York. CODEN was initially created as a memory aid for the publications in Bishop's reference collection. Bishop took initial letters of words from periodical titles, thereby using a code which helped him arrange the collected publications. In 1953 he published his documentation system, originally designed as a four-letter CODEN system; volume and page numbers have been added, in order to cite and locate exactly an article in a magazine. Later, a variation was published in 1957. The development of CODEN took place in a world before the existence of such systems as the ISO 4 standard and the ISSN standard; at the time, Bishop was not reinventing a wheel but rather pioneering a wheel that others would later replace.

After Bishop had assigned about 4,000 CODEN, the four-letter CODEN system was further developed since 1961 by L. E. Kuentzel at ASTM, the American Society for Testing and Materials (now ASTM International). He also introduced the fifth character to CODEN. In the beginning of the computer age the CODEN was thought as a machine-readable identification system for periodicals. In several updates since 1963, CODEN were registered and published in the CODEN for Periodical Titles by ASTM, counting to about 128,000 at the end of 1974.

Although it was soon recognized in 1966 that a five-character CODEN would not be sufficient to provide all future periodical titles with CODEN, it was still defined as a five-character code as given in ASTM standard E250 until 1972. In 1976 the ASTM standard E250-76 defined a six-character CODEN.

Beginning in the year 1975, the CODEN system was within the responsibility of the American Chemical Society.

Today, the first four characters of the six-character CODEN for a periodical are taken from the initial letters of the words from its title, followed by a fifth letter—one of the first six letters (A–F) of the alphabet. The sixth and last character of the CODEN is an alphanumeric check character calculated from the preceding letters. CODEN always uses capital letters.

In contrast to a periodical CODEN, the first two characters of a CODEN assigned to a non-serial publication (e.g. conference proceedings) are digits. The third and fourth characters are letters. The fifth and sixth character corresponds to the serial CODEN, but differs in that the fifth character is taken from all letters of the alphabet.

In 1975, the International CODEN Service located at Chemical Abstracts Service (CAS) became responsible for further development of the CODEN. The CODEN is automatically assigned to all publications referred on CAS. On request of publishers the International CODEN Service also assigns CODEN for non-chemistry-related publications. For this reason CODEN may also be found in other data bases (e.g. RTECS, or BIOSIS) and are assigned also to serials or magazines, which are not referred in CAS.

== Current sources ==
CODEN assigned until 1966 can be looked up at the two-volume CODEN for Periodical Titles issued by L. E. Kuentzel. CODEN assigned until 1974 were published by J. G. Blumenthal. CODEN assigned until 1998 and their disintegration can be found at the International CODEN Directory (ISSN 0364-3670), which has been published since 1980 as a microfiches issue.

Finding a current CODEN is now best done with the online database of CASSI (Chemical Abstracts Service Source Index), covering all registered titles, CODEN, ISSN, ISBN, abbreviations for publications indexed by CAS since 1907, including serial and non-serial scientific and technical publications.

CASSI online is the replacement for CASSI as a printed serial issue (ISSN 0738-6222), or as the Collective Index (ISSN 0001-0634). CASSI will no longer be published in print. Only the CD-ROM issue of CASSI (ISSN 1081-1990) will be published furthermore.

== Examples ==
- To the journal Nature the CODEN NATUAS is assigned.
- To Technology Review the CODEN TEREAU is assigned.
- The Proceedings of the International Conference on Food Factors, Chemistry and Cancer Prevention (ISBN 4-431-70196-6) uses the CODEN 66HYAL.
- To Recent Advances in Natural Products Research, 3rd International Symposium on Recent Advances in Natural Products Research the CODEN 69ACLK is assigned.
- US patent applications use CODEN USXXDP.
- German patent applications use CODEN GWXXBX.

== See also ==
- ISO 4
- International Standard Serial Number (ISSN)
- International Standard Book Number (ISBN)
- Library of Congress Control Number (LCCN)
